Canadian Hydro Developers, Inc. was a Canadian company that operated 12 hydroelectric power sites, eight wind power sites and one biomass power site in Canada.

Canadian Hydro was founded by two brothers John and Ross Keating with Jack McCleary.  In 1989 Canadian Hydro had secured $1.3 million in equity and a contract with TransAlta to build three small run-of-river facilities.  Revenue from these plants were then used in part to finance the future plants.

In January 2005 the firm bought Canadian Renewable Energy Corporation (CREC).

In December 2006 the firm bought Vector Wind Energy
which has over 13 projects either built or in the process as of 2007.

Announced in February 2007 (and finalized in March) the firm bought GW Power Corporation.

In December 2009 TransAlta acquired Canadian Hydro Developers at $5.25 cash per share.

Generating facilities 
All facilities are owned by Canadian Hydro Developers.

References

External links
 Company website

Defunct electric power companies of Canada
Companies based in Calgary
2009 mergers and acquisitions
2009 disestablishments in Alberta
Hydroelectric power companies of Canada